Abu Hafs Sughdi was an Iranian poet and musician of the late-third/ninth to early-fourth/tenth century. Not much is known about his life. But, it is believed that Abu Hafs was the first poet to write poetry in New Persian language. He was possibly the inventor of the musical instrument called the shahrūd. According to some primary sources, he was the author of an Arabic-Persian dictionary as well, which is lost today, but was available as late as 11th-century AH. It is also possible that the author of this dictionary was another person also named Abu Hafs.

Shams-i Qays-i Razi is the first person who mentioned Abu Hafs in al-Muʿjam fī maʿāyīr ashʿār al-ʿajam. He claimed that Abu Hafs was the first Persian poet. Later biographers of Abu Hafs repeated this claim, but it is known that there were some other Persian poets during the Tahirid and Saffarid era who lived before Abu Hafs, like Muhammad ibn Wasif, Abu'l-Abbas Marwazi, Hanzala Badghisi.

References

9th-century Persian-language poets
10th-century Persian-language poets
9th-century Iranian people
10th-century Iranian people
10th-century musicians